Murray Smith may refer to:

Murray Smith (Alberta politician), Canadian lawyer and politician, member of the Legislative Assembly of Alberta, 1993–2004
Murray Smith (Canadian politician) (1930–2010), MP for Winnipeg North, 1958–1962
Murray Smith (New Zealand politician), United Future New Zealand Party politician & MP, 2002–2005
Murray Smith (writer) (1940–2003), British TV writer and producer
Murray Robert Smith (1941–2009), New Zealand Labour Party politician & MP
Robert Murray Smith (1831–1921), known as Murray Smith, politician in colonial Victoria, Australia
Murray Smith (philosopher and film theorist), British professor of film studies and philosopher at the University of Kent

See also
Joanna Murray-Smith (born 1962), Australian author
Stephen Murray-Smith (1922–1988), Australian writer, father of Joanna